Jens Christian Hansen (5 May 1932 in Bodø – 8 May 2014) was a Norwegian geographer.

He took the dr.philos. degree in 1970 with the thesis Administrative grenser og tettstedsvekst. After a period as a docent at the Norwegian School of Economics he was a professor at the University of Bergen from 1972. He was a fellow of the Norwegian Academy of Science and Letters from 1985, of the Academia Europaea and of the Royal Norwegian Society of Sciences and Letters. He died in May 2014.

References

1932 births
2014 deaths
Norwegian geographers
Academic staff of the Norwegian School of Economics
Academic staff of the University of Bergen
Members of Academia Europaea
Members of the Norwegian Academy of Science and Letters
Royal Norwegian Society of Sciences and Letters
People from Bodø